The Page 99 test is a method of evaluating a work of fiction suggested by literary critic Ford Madox Ford.  
Ford suggested that prospective readers open a book and read page 99 to gain a sense of how well written the work is while avoiding any back-cover synopsis or the first few pages, as these are typically given extra attention during editing and may not reflect the quality of the book as a whole.

References

Literature